Vázquez de Coronado, and commonly known just as Coronado, is the eleventh canton in the province of San José in Costa Rica. The head city of the canton is San Isidro.

Toponymy
Named in honor of the first Spanish colonial governor of Costa Rica, Juan Vázquez de Coronado, nephew of the famous explorer Francisco Vázquez de Coronado.

History 
Vázquez de Coronado was created on 15 November 1910 by decree 17.

Geography 

Vázquez de Coronado has an area of  km² and a mean elevation of  metres.

The canton of the highlands rises out of the suburbs of San José to encompass a major portion of the Cordillera Central (Central Mountain Range) and Braulio Carrillo National Park. The Sucio River forms the western boundary of the canton, while the Macho, Zurquí and Patria rivers establish the canton's limits to the east. The northern tip of the canton is marked by the confluence of the Sucio and Patria rivers.

The canton is geologically formed from volcanic materials associated with the Irazu and Barva volcanoes. It has an irregular morphology with soils suitable for agriculture and dairy farming.

Coronado has a maximum altitude of 1,510 m in San Rafael district and a minimum of 1,335 m in Patalillo district. The canton has rivers that descend to the Atlantic seaboard such as Sucio, Patria and Zurquí that also serve as boundaries with the provinces of Cartago, Heredia and the canton of Moravia respectively.

In the Pacific slope, the rivers Agra, Ipís and the Virilla and its tributaries (Durazno, Macho, Quebrada Varela). 
The rivers Ipís, Durazno and Macho serve as boundaries of the canton, the first two with Goicoechea and the last with Moravia.

Climate 
The canton has high rainfall and a typical mountain climate, in fact, many Costa Ricans traditionally associate this canton with its cold climate.

Districts 
The canton of Vázquez de Coronado is subdivided into the following districts:
 San Isidro
 San Rafael
 Dulce Nombre de Jesús
 Patalillo
 Cascajal

Demographics 

For the 2011 census, Vázquez de Coronado had a population of  inhabitants.

Economy
The main economic activities include dairy farming, dairy and agribusiness, coffee and other agricultural products, trade, and services such tourism. The municipality has a vibrant commercial activity of the most diverse nature which involves factories, supermarkets, grocery stores, private health services, agro-veterinary services, bank branches, clothing and footwear, electrical shops, restaurants, video stores, bars and more.

Public Services
Since the fire that affected Dr. Rafael Calderon Guardia Hospital Nacional in 2005, the Coronado Integrated Health Center serves 24-hour emergency and outpatient. Emergencies of all kinds are served and the center supports Goicoechea and Moravia cantons that do not have emergency services 24 hours, or on Saturdays, Sundays or holidays. Currently the Directorate Medical Center is in charge of Dr. Rojas Cerna, and coordination of emergency services is in charge of Soto Porras, Charpantier and Rivera doctors.

Institutions
The canton of Coronado is home to important institutions such as :
  (IICA)
 National Olympic Committee
 Research Institute Clodomiro Picado Twight of the Faculty of Microbiology of the University of Costa Rica, dedicated to research with snakes and serums against the venom of these animals
 Nursing home of the Missionaries of Charity in turn serves as a base of operations in Central America
 Coronado Day Center for Seniors
 Self-Advocates Health Association of Coronado, who owns the Home Institution Saving alcoholic and drug addict Coronado, where treatment is given on additions
 National Council for Scientific and Technological Research (CONICIT)

Transportation

Road transportation 
The canton is covered by the following road routes:

References

External links

Cantons of San José Province